Teody Belarmino (1922-1984) was a Filipino actor originally from the rustic town of Calamba, Laguna.

The first stage of Belarmino's career was dedicated to his home studio LVN Pictures. Belarmino is one of the leading men in the stable of fine seasoned actors under the stewardship of LVN Studios. Some of his leading ladies are: Rebecca Gonzales in Mutya ng Pasig,  Tessie Quintana in Kapitan Erlinda ng Candaba,  Celia Flor in Ang Tapis Mo Inday,  and Lilia Dizon in Venus.

Filmography

Films under LVN Pictures
Malaya (Mutya sa Gubat) (1948)
Ibigin Mo Ako,  Lalaking Matapang (1949)
Capas (1949)
Hen. Gregorio del Pilar (1949)
Mutya ng Pasig (1950)
Florante at Laura (1950)
Candaba (1950)
Nagsaulian ng Kandila  (1950)
Tininti Del Barrio (1950)
Ang Tapis Mo Inday (1951)
Venus (1951)
Dalawang Prinsipeng Kambal (1951)
Krus Na Bakal (1954)
Kandilerong Pilak (1954)
Tagapagmana (1955)

Under other production companies
Lihim ni Bathala (Royal, 1951)
Singsing Na Sinulid (Royal, 1951)
Elephant Girl (Shaw & Sons, 1955)
Heneral Paua (Larry Santiago, 1956)
Princesa ng Kagubatan (Everlasting, 1956)
Haring Tulisan (Everlasting, 1956)
Impiyerno sa Paraiso (Everlasting, 1958)
Halik ni Hudas (1961)
Noli Me Tángere (1961) - Tarcilo
North Harbor (1961)
Sigaw sa Langit (1961)
Umasa Ka Mahal Ko (sa Bilisan) (1961)
El filibusterismo (1962)
Hindi Kami Laos (1962)
Madugong Paghihiganti (The Massacre) (1963)
Angustia (1963)
Shoot to Kill (1963)
Ugat (1974)
Basta't Isipin Mong Mahal Kita (1975)
Dugo at Pag-ibig sa Kapirasong Lupa (first segment, 1975)
Diwang Kayumanggi (Prinsesang Mandirigma) (1975)
Arnis (1979)
Rampador Alindog (Barako ng Cavite) (1981)
Kumander Melody (1982)

Late in his career, Belarmino appeared in notable supporting roles in the following films:  Boy Zapanta (Pentagon Films), Ang Kabayaran (Academy Films), Bakit May Putik ang Bulaklak? (GS Pictures), Ang Halaga Ay Luha, Laman at Dugo (Emerald Films), and Sa Maamo...Mabangis Na Kamay (P. Maglinao Enterprises). Belarmino also had a brief stint in the television series Annaliza starring Julie Vega.

External links

1922 births
1984 deaths
20th-century Filipino male actors
Male actors from Laguna (province)
People from Calamba, Laguna